European Weightlifting Championships is an annual event organised by the European Weightlifting Federation (EWF). It has been held since 1896. A separate event for women was held from 1988 to 1997, after which both championships have been held as one event.

Editions 
Results:

Team ranking 
 History - Team ranking system 
 Team ranking was started from 1949
 1–7 August 1948 FIH Congress, London : For the team classification 5-3-1 points are distributed for the 1st to the 3rd place.
 2–7 November 1957 FIHC Congress, Teheran : For the team classification, there are distributed 10-6-4-3-2-1 points for the first to the sixth place.
 3–24 May 1958 Tokyo : For the team classification 7-5-4-3-2-1 points are distributed for the 1st to the 6th place.
 4- 1973 : For the team classification 12-9-8-7-6-5-4-3-2-1 points are distributed for the 1st to 10th place (only for the total).
 5- 1977 : For the team classification 12-9-8-7-6-5-4-3-2-1 points are distributed for the 1st to 10th place for the individual lifts and the total.
 6- 12–14 January 1984 IWF Executive Board Meeting, Herzogenaurach. 27 July, IWF Congress, Los Angeles: For the team classification 16-14-13-12-11-10-9- 8-7-6-5-4-3-2-1 points are distributed for the 1st to 15th place.
 7–1 May 1996 IWF Executive Board Meeting, Warsaw : For the team classification 28-25-23-22-21-20-19-18-17-16-15-14-13-12-11-10-9-8-7-6-5-4-3-2-1 points are distributed for the 1st to 25th place.
 10 and 11 December 1996, IWF Congress, Athens: Two-Year-Suspension for a first doping offence.

All-time medal table (1914–2022)
Ranking by Big (Total result) medals:

See also
 List of European Weightlifting Championships medalists
 European Junior & U23 Weightlifting Championships

References

External links
 New site of European Weitlifting Federation
 Past site of European Weitlifting Federation 
 https://web.archive.org/web/*/http://ewfed.com/
 International Weightlifting Federation (IWF)
 European Championships From 1907 to Today @ Lift Up: Search
 Database Weightlifting
 IWRP
 1990-2021 Results
 EWF Results 
 Past Results

 
Recurring sporting events established in 1896
Weightlifting competitions
Weightlifting in Europe
European championships